John Parker IV (June 24, 1759 – April 20, 1832) by birth inherited a spot in South Carolina's aristocracy. He was born to John Parker III and Mary Daniell, granddaughter of Governor Robert Daniell. He married Susannah Middleton, daughter of Henry Middleton and sister of Arthur Middleton. He was American planter of the Hayes Plantation and lawyer from Charleston, South Carolina. He also served as a delegate for South Carolina to the Congress of the Confederation from 1786 to 1788.

Biography
He was educated in Charleston and England, and graduated from the Middle Temple, London. He returned to South Carolina, settled on his rice plantation, and engaged in planting. He was admitted to the bar in 1785 and practiced in Charleston. He served in the Congress of the Confederation from 1786 to 1788. His father served in the colony and eventually the state in various capacities including as the state senator for Goose Creek, South Carolina as well as on the Privy Council under John Rutledge. His brother Thomas Parker was appointed by George Washington as U.S. District Attorney; and in 1812 U.S. Judge for an interim by President James Madison. Thomas was married to Mary Drayton, daughter Chief Justice William Henry Drayton and sister to Governor John Drayton, and planted the Woodlands Plantation. John Parker was buried on the "Hayes" estate in St. James' Parish, Goose Creek, near Charleston.

Notes

References

External links
Political facts about John Parker

1759 births
1832 deaths
Continental Congressmen from South Carolina
18th-century American politicians
Politicians from Charleston, South Carolina